Turbo is a town in Uasin Gishu County, Kenya, approximately 34 kilometers northwest of Eldoret town (the capital of the county), along the Nairobi-Malaba Road.

In 2009 it had a population of 35,000 people. People from the Kalenjin tribe are the most numerous inhabitants, although Tachoni, Luyha, Kikuyu and Somali also live in the town. Its main economic activity is agriculture.

Popular places and landmarks in Turbo include Mchanganyiko Bar and Restaurant, Maseke Agro vet Rubis petrol station, Turbo Water Supply and the National Youth Service center.

It is home to the  President of Kenya, William Ruto.

References

Populated places in Uasin Gishu County